Thrasamund and its variants (Thrasimund, Transimund, Transamund and Transmund) are masculine given names of Gothic origin.

It may refer to:
 Thrasamund (450–523), king of the Vandals
 Transamund I of Spoleto, duke from 665 to 703
 Transamund II of Spoleto, duke on three occasions between 724 and 745
 Transamund III of Spoleto, duke from 983 to c. 989, also count Transmund I of Chieti
 Transmund II of Chieti, count from c. 989 to 1017
 Transmund III of Chieti, count in the 1050s
 Transmund IV of Chieti, count in the 1070s
 Transmund (bishop of Valva), from 1073 to 1081